Decadence is a 1994 British film starring Joan Collins and Steven Berkoff, written and directed by Berkoff and based on his play of the same name.

It was filmed entirely in Luxembourg and featured, as guest stars, Christopher Biggins, Marc Sinden and Michael Winner.

External links
 

Films directed by Steven Berkoff
1994 films
1994 drama films
British films based on plays
Films scored by Stewart Copeland
British drama films
1990s English-language films
1990s British films